R.L. Boyce (born August 15, 1955) is an American blues singer, songwriter, and guitarist born and raised in Como, Mississippi, United States.

He is a protege of Hill country blues musicians including R L Burnside, and Mississippi Fred McDowell.

Boyce began his career in the early 1960s playing drums for his uncle, the fife and drum performer Othar Turner. Later he was the drummer for Jessie Mae Hemphill and is heard on her 1990 album, Feelin' Good.

His debut album, Ain't the Man's Alright was released when he was 52 years old, and featured musicians including Cedric Burnside, Luther Dickinson, and Calvin Jackson.

His second album release, Roll and Tumble was released on September 8, 2017, on Waxploitation Records.  The album included the father and son double drumming team of Cedric Burnside (R.L. Burnside's drummer and grandson) and Calvin Jackson. The album was produced by Luther Dickinson of The Black Crowes and North Mississippi Allstars fame, and David Katznelson.

The cover of Roll and Tumble is a portrait of R.L. Boyce, painted by the contemporary artist James Jean.

Studio albums
 Ain't the Man's Alright (Sutro Park, 2007)
 Roll and Tumble (Waxploitation Records, 2017)
 Rattlesnake Boogie (Waxploitation Records, 2018)
 Ain't Gonna Play Too Long (Waxploitation Records, 2018)

Documentaries featuring Boyce
Martin Scorsese Presents The Blues: A Musical Journey (2003) featured the song "Shortnin'/ Henduck Traditional" by Otha Turner which included Boyce on bass and snare drums.
M for Mississippi (2008) included an interview with Boyce
Moonshine & Mojo Hands (2014) included an interview with Boyce 
I Am The Blues (2015) included a performance by Boyce

References

External links
 2001 interview with RL Boyce and Jessie "Chip" Daniels at 50 Miles of Elbow Room

1955 births
20th-century African-American male singers
African-American rock musicians
American blues guitarists
American male guitarists
American blues singers
Country blues musicians
Juke Joint blues musicians
Blues musicians from Mississippi
People from Como, Mississippi
20th-century American guitarists
Guitarists from Mississippi
Living people
21st-century American guitarists
African-American guitarists
21st-century African-American male singers